Chuanshan may refer to the following locations in the People's Republic of China:

Chuanshan Archipelago (川山群岛), group of islands in the South China Sea, just off the coast of Guangdong
Chuanshan District (船山区), Suining, Sichuan
Chuanshan, Huanjiang County (川山镇), town in Huanjiang Maonan Autonomous County, Guangxi
Chuanshan, Liujiang County (穿山镇), town in Guangxi